= Mala, Croatia =

Mala
- Village
- Location within Croatia
- Coordinates: 45°15′N 17°22′E
- Country: Croatia

Population (2011)
  - Total: 0
- Time zone: UTC+1 (CET)
  - Summer (DST): UTC+2 (CEST)

Mala is an uninhabited settlement in Croatia, a 2011 census recorded no residents, reflecting the broader demographic decline experienced by rural areas in the country. Mala, and Croatia as a whole has experienced significant rural depopulation due to factors such as migration, war-related displacement, and urbanization.
